General Santos is a city in the Philippines, General Santos may also refer to:

Alejo Santos (1911–1984), Philippine Commonwealth Army brigadier general
Alfredo Santos (1905–1990), Armed Forces of the Philippines general
Felimon Santos Jr. (born 1964), Philippine Army general
Paulino Santos (1890–1945), Philippine Army major general